Khalkhalio River is a river in western India in Gujarat whose origin is Bhabhat hills. Its basin has a maximum length of 50 km.

References

Rivers of Gujarat
Rivers of India